Nutri-Asia, Inc., formerly Southeast Asia Food, Inc., is a Philippine food company and the leading producer of condiment products in the Philippines. Among its best known brands are Datu Puti, Mang Tomas, UFC Catsup and Silver Swan. As of 2019, the company has of a total 116 distributors locally and international.

NutriAsia was founded in 1990 as Enriton Natural Foods by Joselito Campos, the eldest son of industrialist José Yao Campos. Campos is also vice chairman of Del Monte Philippines and chairman of Fort Bonifacio Development Corporation.

History
Joselito Campos established Enriton Natural Foods, Inc. in 1990, with Nelicom as its lone brand. Later that year, Enriton acquires Jufran and Mafran, while also entering a joint venture with Acres & Acres. The joint venture would then be called Southeast Asia Food Inc. (SAFI). In 1996, SAFI acquires the Universal Foods Corporation (UFC), and establishes the holding company Nutri-Asia, Inc. for the acquisition.

2018 labor strike
On June 4, 2018, 200 people composed of Nutri-Asia workers and supporters, under the leadership of Nagkakaisang Manggagawa ng NutriAsia Inc, staged a labor protest, forming a picket line at the Nutri-Asia factory in Marilao.

On February 23, 2018, reports from the Philippine Department of Labor and Employment (DOLE) said that it had directed Nutri-Asia to "give regular employment to 914 employees" which had been hired under their contractors Alternative Network Resources Unlimited Multipurpose Cooperative; Serbiz Multi-Purpose Cooperative; and B-Mirk Enterprises Corp, because their work arrangements were considered labor-only subcontracting, which is not allowed by the Philippines' labor code.  However, Nutri-Asia rejected this interpretation.

Workers of B-Mirk Enterprises Corp, citing contractualization practices and unsafe conditions, decided to form a union. The officers of this union were laid off, and those suspected of being members said that they were threatened with suspensions.

On June 25, 2018, DOLE Region 3 reversed the February decision, saying that the workers who went on strike had an employer-employee relationship with B-Mirk, rather than with NutriAsia.  The protesters continued to picket the Marilao site.

On June 30, 2018, the protesters held an ecumenical mass at the picket site, with about 300 people in attendance including the protesters and numerous supporters. As the mass ended, police forces arrived to disperse the crowd. The dispersal that followed saw at least 30 individuals injured. 19 persons were arrested, including 14 who were either workers or supporters; and five journalists who were covering the celebration of the mass.

Two of the five journalists arrested were campus journalists Psalty Caluza and Jon Bonifacio, both students at the University of the Philippines Diliman.  At the time, Caluza was a fourth year journalism student from the UP College of Mass Communication, who was taking an internship with media organization AlterMidya. Bonifacio, an Oblation scholar and who was vying for graduation with honors, was covering the event for Scientia, the student publication of the UP College of Science.

The violent dispersal was quickly condemned by the DOLE and by religious leaders, including Catholic Auxiliary Bishop Broderick Pabillo and the ecumenical non-catholic National Council of Churches in the Philippines (NCCP), and was widely criticized by the public on social media.

The Philippine Commission on Human Rights expressed concern and CHR spokesperson Jacqueline Ann C. de Guia announced that they would investigate the violent dispersal of the protesters.

References

External links

1990 establishments in the Philippines
Companies based in Bonifacio Global City
Condiment companies of the Philippines
Food and drink companies established in 1990
Privately held companies of the Philippines